On Fire is an album by the Swedish stoner metal band Spiritual Beggars. It was released on 2 November 2002.

Track listing 
All songs written by Michael Amott, except where noted.  Arranged by Spiritual Beggars.
 Street Fighting Saviours – 4:22 (Amott, Per Wiberg)
 Young Man, Old Soul – 3:18
 Killing Time – 3:37 (Amott, Ludwig Witt)
 Fools Gold – 4:01
 Black Feathers – 6:29
 Beneath the Skin – 3:51
 Fejee Mermaid – 1:59
 Dance of the Dragon King – 3:04
 Tall Tales – 4:28
 The Lunatic Fringe – 5:19
 Look Back – 5:27 (Amott, Janne "JB" Christoffersson)

Bonus tracks (Japanese edition)
Burden of Dreams – 5:27 (2002 digipak edition and 2007 reissue)
Blood of The Sun – 3:23 (Leslie West, Felix Pappalardi, Gail Collins)

Personnel 
Janne "JB" Christoffersson: vocals
Michael Amott: acoustic and electric guitars
Per Wiberg: keyboards, organ, piano, vocals
Roger Nilsson: bass guitar
Ludwig Witt: drums, percussion

Production
Produced by Michael Amott and Rickard Bengtsson
Engineers, mixing: Andy Sneap, Fredrik Nordström, Rickard Bengtsson
Mastering: Goran Finnburg

References 

2002 albums
Spiritual Beggars albums